The Cabot Head Shale is a geologic formation in Michigan. It preserves fossils dating back to the Silurian period.

See also

 List of fossiliferous stratigraphic units in Michigan

References
 

Silurian Michigan
Silurian System of North America
Llandovery geology